International nomenclature may refer to;
Stock nomenclature for inorganic compounds
International System for Human Cytogenomic Nomenclature